Bander Beila (chief town Bayla), also known as Bander Beyla (Italian: Bander Beila ) is a district in the northeastern Bari region of Puntland It is an old town near the Indian Ocean and is mountainous with old buildings. The Beyla region is a hybrid of fishing (with Yemen) and a small number have farms. It is a peaceful region with little police

References

External links
 Districts of Somalia
 Administrative map of Bandar Beyla District

Districts of Somalia

Bari, Somalia